Katekan is a village in Ngadirejo District, Temanggung Regency in Central Java Province. Its population is 4930.

Climate
Katekan has a subtropical highland climate (Cfb). It has moderate to little rainfall from June to September and heavy to very heavy rainfall from October to May.

References

Villages in Central Java